HMT Islay (T172) was a British Royal Navy  armed trawler of the Second World War.

On 28 June 1942, Islay picked up 19 survivors from the British merchant steamer , which had been hit by two torpedoes from the German submarine  in the Mediterranean Sea to the southwest of Haifa and had sunk with the loss of 14 crew members and gunners.

On 10 August 1942, Islay sank the Italian submarine  in Haifa Bay while under the command of Lieutenant Commander John Ross of North Shields, who was awarded the Distinguished Service Cross for his actions. Scirè was carrying 11 Decima Flottiglia MAS commandos, who were intending to attack shipping in Haifa harbour by means of human torpedoes. Royal Air Force aircraft and coastal artillery also were involved in the sinking, which had been facilitated by Ultra intelligence. Scirè had previously launched human torpedo attacks on British naval units in Gibraltar and Alexandria, Egypt.

In October 1946, the ship was sold into commercial service. Operating under the French flag as Sainte Anne, she disappeared without trace in the Mediterranean Sea after a last communication while off the Balearic Islands on 15 March 1950.

References

World War II naval ships of the United Kingdom
1941 ships
Maritime incidents in 1950
Missing ships
Ships lost with all hands
Shipwrecks in the Mediterranean Sea